The Worst Hard Time: The Untold Story of Those Who Survived the Great American Dust Bowl is an American history book written by New York Times journalist Timothy Egan and published by Houghton Mifflin in 2006. It tells the problems of people who lived through The Great Depression's Dust Bowl, as a disaster tale.

Egan and The Worst Hard Time won the  2006 National Book Award for Nonfiction
and the 2006 Washington State Book Award in History/Biography.

Egan attributes the Dust Bowl tragedy to reckless agricultural misuse of the land, and tells "vivid" and "poignant" stories about individual farmers and their families.

References

Bibliographic information

External links
Presentation by Egan on The Worst Hard Time, January 16, 2006

Non-fiction books about the Great Depression
Works about the Dust Bowl
National Book Award for Nonfiction winning works
American non-fiction books
2006 non-fiction books
Houghton Mifflin books